Oliver Acquah (born 22 March 1946) is a Ghanaian footballer. He competed in the 1968 and 1972 Summer Olympics.

References

1946 births
Living people
Footballers at the 1968 Summer Olympics
Footballers at the 1972 Summer Olympics
Ghanaian footballers
Olympic footballers of Ghana
1968 African Cup of Nations players
1970 African Cup of Nations players
Footballers from Accra
Association football midfielders